Emmy Perry (born September 10, 2004) is an American child actress.

Career
Perry is the daughter of game designer and producer David Perry. She started acting in the theater, and when she was 7, shared the stage at the Greek Theater in a duet with Kristin Chenoweth. She has had parts in TV shows including Glee. In 2015 she costarred with Morgan Fairchild and Jason London in the film Wiener Dog Internationals as "Kitty". Her first lead role is in the 2017 feature film "Scales, Mermaids are Real", as Siren Phillips alongside Morgan Fairchild and Elisabeth Röhm. The movie is handled by VMI Worldwide. In 2022 she acted in the film Mid-Century as "Hannah" along with Stephen Lang (the main antagonist from the movie Avatar), also Shane West and Bruce Dern. 
 
She was a Celebrity Luminary for the Helen Woodward Animal Center's "Remember me Thursday"  and named one of their Christmas Angels. Perry was named one of 12 of the most talented and driven standout Whiz Kids in Orange County, California. Perry is also an ambassador for Generation On  and named a Hasbro Community Action Hero Semi finalist for her dedication to service and efforts to impact their local and global communities. She was also asked to be a part of The Project For Girls.

Charity work
Perry is an animal advocate and founder of Emmy's Hope, an animal rescue charity. The major brand Kleenex sponsored the charity with a weekend of free adoptions and filmed a national commercial in honor of Emmy and Emmy's Hope. Perry has also spoken in front of the Orange County Board of Directors and Board of Supervisors on behalf of homeless animals and animal welfare, and received several recognitions and awards.

Filmography

Films

Television

References

External links 

Emmy's Official Facebook Page
Emmy Perry on YouTube
Emmy Perry on TikTok

Living people
21st-century American actresses
American child actresses
American television actresses
American film actresses
People from California
2004 births
People from Orange County, California